Emmylou "Lala" Jacolo Taliño-Mendoza (born February 25, 1972) is a Filipina politician. She has been elected for three terms as a Member of the House of Representatives of the Philippines, representing the 1st District of North Cotabato. She first won election to Congress in 2001, and was re-elected in 2004 and 2007.

She won as Governor of the Province during the 2010, 2013, and 2016 elections, and she is the second female Governor of Cotabato next to Dr. Rosario Diaz.

During the 2019 elections, she was elected Vice-Governor of North Cotabato with 326,718 votes. She won her 4th term as Governor in the 2022 election.

Education

For her primary and secondary Education, She Studied at Notre Dame of Kidapawan for Girls or now conferred as St. Mary's Academy of Kidapawan. She studied at Ateneo de Davao University for her tertiary education

Personal life 
She is married to Congressman Raymond Democrito C. Mendoza, representative of the TUCP Partylist. Together they have one son, Emilio Ramon, and she has a daughter from a previous marriage, Ma. Alana Samantha.

References

 

Living people
1972 births
Governors of Cotabato
Kabalikat ng Malayang Pilipino politicians
Members of the House of Representatives of the Philippines from Cotabato
Women members of the House of Representatives of the Philippines
People from Cotabato
Ateneo de Davao University alumni
21st-century Filipino women politicians
21st-century Filipino politicians
Women provincial governors of the Philippines